Synaphea odocoileops is a shrub endemic to Western Australia.

The tufted compact shrub typically grows to  that blooms between August and October producing yellow flowers.

It is found in swamps and winter wet areas in the South West and Peel regions of Western Australia where it grows in sandy-clay-loamy soils.

References

Eudicots of Western Australia
odocoileops
Endemic flora of Western Australia
Plants described in 1995